Hatun Kunka (Quechua hatun big, kunka throat, gullet, "big throat (or gullet)", also spelled Jatuncunca) is a mountain in the Cordillera Negra in the Andes of Peru which reaches a height of approximately . It is located in the Ancash Region, Huaylas Province, Pamparomas District, and in the Yungay Province, Quillo District.

References 

Mountains of Peru
Mountains of Ancash Region